Rebecca Davis is a Canadian film and TV actress, best known for her role in Atom Egoyan's Where the Truth Lies.

Career
During her teen years, she spent a lot of time on figure skating. She stopped figure skating at the age of 21, and began studying acting in Sydney, Australia. Returning to Canada, she completed a degree in History and English. She graduated with distinction from the University of Toronto.

She appeared in Atom Egoyan's Where the Truth Lies, alongside Kevin Bacon and Colin Firth. Davis has had roles in television series including Battlestar Galactica, Smallville and Supernatural. In 2010, she appeared in Lifetime Television's He Loves Me. In 2012, she starred with Emmanuelle Vaugier and Carson Kressley in the Hallmark Channel's It's Christmas, Carol!.

In 2013 Rebecca starred in The Woods and the comedy Focus. She appeared on the sitcom Package Deal. 2014 will see her acting in "Hector and the Search for Happiness".

External links

Actresses from Vancouver
Canadian film actresses
Film producers from British Columbia
Canadian television actresses
Canadian women film producers
Canadian women screenwriters
Film directors from Vancouver
Living people
University of Toronto alumni
Writers from Vancouver
Year of birth missing (living people)